Bonnie Holiday was a former American pornographic actress who worked during the 1970s and early 1980s.

Holiday worked as a stripper and started out making loops. She then graduated to feature films with Alex de Renzy's Lady Freaks (1973).

Holiday was featured in the 1970 adult film documentary A History of the Blue Movie, which showed clips of stag films dating from 1915 to 1970. One of her best-known performances can be found in the XRCO Hall of Fame 1977 film Desires Within Young Girls.

See also
 Golden Age of Porn

References

External links
 
 
 

American pornographic film actresses
1952 births
1988 deaths
20th-century American actresses